Jan Szeliga ( ? — 1636, Lviv) was a wandering book printer operating in Polish–Lithuanian Commonwealth. In particular, he worked in Krakow, Lviv,  Dobromyl, Yavoriv, Jarosław, i.e., spending much time in Galicia (Eastern Europe), now Ukraine.

References

Year of birth missing
1636 deaths
17th-century printers
17th-century Polish businesspeople